Hondōri Station may refer to:

 Hondōri Station (Astram Line), a people mover station in Hiroshima, Japan
 Hondōri Station (Hiroden), a tram stop in Hiroshima, Japan
 

ja:本通駅